Neil Fulton is an American attorney who is the 14th Dean of the University of South Dakota School of Law and was the former Federal Public Defender for the District of South Dakota and District of North Dakota from 2010 to 2019.

Education 

Fulton received his bachelor's degree from Yale University in 1994. He enrolled in the University of Minnesota Law School in Minneapolis, Minnesota, where he received his J.D. in 1997, graduating first in his class.

Legal career 
Fulton was a judicial law clerk for Judge Diana Murphy of the United States Eighth Circuit Court of Appeals after graduating from law school.

In 2007, Fulton became Chief of Staff for then-Governor Mike Rounds. In that capacity he oversaw the day-to-day operations of state government, managed legislative and budgetary proposals for the Office of the Governor, drafted legislation on many issues and worked with public and private organizations across the state.

Federal public defender for South Dakota and North Dakota 

In 2010, Fulton was appointed by the United States Court of Appeals for the Eighth Circuit as the Federal Defender for South Dakota and North Dakota.

External links 
 Federal Public Defender for South Dakota and North Dakota website

References

Living people
University of Minnesota Law School alumni
Chiefs of staff to United States state governors
Deans of law schools in the United States
Public defenders
South Dakota lawyers
Year of birth missing (living people)
South Dakota Republicans